The City (French: La Ville) is a 1919 painting by French painter and sculptor Fernand Léger. The painting is Cubist in style and is now in the [[Philadelphia Museum of Artby Albert Eugene Gallatin. Gallatin donated the piece to the museum in 1952 and it has also been shown at the Guggenheim Museum. In reviews of the Guggenheim exhibit, both The City and other works in the show were praised.

References

1919 paintings
Paintings by Fernand Léger
Paintings in the collection of the Philadelphia Museum of Art